Haji chak, also called Hajichack, is a village located in the Gujrat District in the Punjab Province in Pakistan. Haji Chak's population is about four thousand people. It is a village of the union council Noonawali post office Jaurah Karnana and uses postal code 50251.

Populated places in Gujrat District